Gneiss is a common and widely distributed type of metamorphic rock

Gneiss may also refer to:

Places
Gneiss Hills and Gneiss Lake, in Antarctica
Gneiss Point, in Antarctica

Other uses
Gneiss-2, a Soviet airborne radar system

See also